Capital FM may refer to:

Radio stations

Europe
 Capital (radio network), a network of twelve UK-based music radio stations
 Capital FM 105.3, a Russian radio station
 YLE Capital FM, a Finnish radio station

North America
 CIBX-FM, a Fredericton, New Brunswick radio station that used the "Capital FM" brand name in the 2000s and 2010s
 CKGC-FM, an Iqaluit, Nunavut radio station that uses Capital FM as a brand name
 CKRA-FM, "96.3 Capital FM", an Edmonton, Alberta radio station

Africa 
 98.4 Capital FM, a Kenyan radio station owned by Capital Group LTD
 Capital Radio 604, a former South African radio station

Asia
 Capital FM 88.9, a former radio station in Kuala Lumpur, Malaysia
 Radio Capital (Dhaka), a radio station based in Dhaka, Bangladesh
 Capital 95.8FM, a Mandarin-language radio station in Singapore
 DWFT, broadcasting as 104.3 Capital FM2, a radio station in Metro Manila, Philippines.

See also
 Capital Radio (disambiguation)